Off to Havana I Go (Spanish: A La Habana me voy), is a 1950 musical Argentine film directed by Luis Bayón Herrera and written by Carlos A. Petit and Rodolfo Sciammarella. It stars Blanquita Amaro and Otto Sirgo. It premiered on 28 June 1950.

Cast
Blanquita Amaro
Otto Sirgo
Tito Lusiardo
Juan Lado
María Esther Gamas
Héctor Palacios
Adolfo Stray
Pedro Vargas
Raquel Maceda – dancer
Rolando García – dancer

References

External links 
 

1950 films
1950 musical films
1950s Spanish-language films
Cuban musical films
Films directed by Luis Bayón Herrera
Rumberas films
Argentine musical films
Argentine black-and-white films
1950s Argentine films
1950s Mexican films